The Soulmen were a Slovak rock band singing in English, that existed from 1967 to 1968. Together with The Beatmen they were the most important Slovak Big Beat bands. They are often considered the successors of The Beatmen and often mentioned alongside of them in the literature, partly because of the presence of legendary Dežo Ursiny in both bands and also of the name in the similar style, but their music was a significant shift in style - The Beatmen more or less didn't cross the borders of the Mersey sound, whereas The Soulmen's music was already more similar to the contemporary western RnB and rock music. Cream is often cited as the main influence on The Soulmen's music. The band was a power trio consisting of guitarist Dežo Ursiny, bassist Fedor Frešo and drummer Vlado Mallý, all of them contributing to vocals as well. They would later become members of several subsequent popular Czechoslovak bands, such as Prúdy, Collegium Musicum and Fermata. Ursiny, after dismissing his Provisorium would go on a solo career in the seventies.

History

The Soulmen were founded in summer of 1967. Ursiny, who had been a member of The Beatmen parted ways with this band, because he refused to emigrate to the West Germany with them. After several unsuccessful attempts to found a new band, he founded The Soulmen with bassist Fedor Frešo and drummer Dušan Hájek, who was soon replaced by Vlado Mallý. In December 1967 they performed at the 1st Czechoslovak Beat Festival in Lucerna hall, Prague, where they were proclaimed the best band of the festival. They played four songs: Sample Of Happiness, Baby Do Not Cry, I Have Found and a cover of Beatles' She's Leaving Home. In spring 1968 they toured around Czechoslovakia and Hungary and recorded their only record, an EP Sample Of Happiness/Wake Up/I Wish I Were/Baby Do Not Cry, in March. In May, after another Czechoslovak tour and releasing their EP, they broke up due to severe tensions and misunderstandings between the members.

In November 1968 another group, The New Soulmen, was founded, with Ursiny on guitar, Ján Lehotský on keyboards, Fedor Letňan on bass and Peter Mráz on drums. They recorded two songs in November (I Have Found and It's Time), but broke up soon at the beginning of 1969, without releasing anything.

Band line-up
 Dežo Ursiny - guitar, vocals (d. 1995)
 Fedor Frešo - bass, vocals (d. 2018)
 Vlado Mallý - drums, vocals
 Dušan Hájek - drums, vocals

Discography
 EP 1968 (Panton)
 Sample Of Happiness (Ursiny/Juraj Lihosit)
 Wake Up (Ursiny/Elena Ursinyová sr.)
 I Wish I Were (Ursiny/Elena Ursinyová sr.)
 Baby Do Not Cry (Ursiny/Elena Ursinyová sr.)

Elena Ursinyová, the lyricist of three of the four songs here, was Dežo Ursiny's mother and she was a teacher of English. She was not listed as an author on the issue, Ursiny was listed as the only author.

See also
 The Beatmen
 Dežo Ursiny

Notes

Slovak rock music groups
Czechoslovak Big Beat groups and musicians
Musical groups established in 1967
Musical groups disestablished in 1968
1967 establishments in Czechoslovakia
1968 disestablishments in Czechoslovakia